This is a list of women artists who were born in Greece or whose artworks are closely associated with that country.

A
Anaxandra (fl. 220s BC), ancient Greek painter
Aristarete, mentioned in Pliny the Elder's Natural History (XL.147-148) in A.D. 77
Arleta (born 1945), musician, writer, illustrator

B
Venia Bechrakis (born 1974), visual artist

C
Chryssa (1933–2013), Greek-American multidisciplinary artist

E
Eirene (1st century BC), ancient Greek artist

F
 Thalia Flora-Karavia (1871–1960), painter
 Timarete (5th century BC)

G
 Katerina Grolliou, artist

I
 Iaia, ancient Greek artist

K
Annetta Kapon (active since 1982), sculptor, installation artist, educator
Marina Karella (born 1940), painter, sculptor
Kora of Sicyon (born c. 650 BC), ancient Greek artist
Aggelika Korovessi (born 1952), sculptor

L
Maria Lalou (born 1977), performance artist
Sophia Laskaridou (1882–1965), Impressionist painter, educator

M
Maria Maragkoudaki (active since 1990), painter
Maria X (active since 1990s), cultural practitioner, painter, writer
Jenny Marketou (borh 1954), Greek-American multidisciplinary artist, lecturer, writer

P
Aglaia Papa (1904–1984), painter
Mina Papatheodorou-Valiraki (active since the 1990s), painter
Eleni Paschalidou-Zongolopoulou (1909–1991), painter
Eva Persaki (active since 1975), painter
Sofia Petropoulou (born 1964), painter
Heleni Polichronatou (born 1959), sculptor

S
Erica Scourti, contemporary artist
Lisa Sotilis (active since 1959), sculptor, painter, jewelry designer
Despina Stokou (born 1978), artist and curator
Danae Stratou (born 1964), visual and installation artist, educator

T
Timarete (5th century BC), ancient Greek painter
Dimitra Tserkezou (1920–2007), sculptor

V
Lydia Venieri (born 1964), sculptor
Erietta Vordoni (born 1959), painter and sculptor

-
Greek women artists, List of
Artists
Artists